Oman– United Arab Emirates are the relations between the United Arab Emirates and Oman. The U.A.E. has an embassy in Muscat while Oman maintains an embassy in Abu Dhabi and a consulate-general in Dubai. Both countries are part of the Middle East region and share close cultural ties. Oman and the U.A.E. also share very large borders with each other, including two exclaves of Oman accessible on land only through the U.A.E, and also border the Gulf of Oman. Both countries are members of the Arab League and Organisation of Islamic Cooperation.

In December 2010, Oman discovered a spy network operated by the United Arab Emirates which collected information on Oman's military and government. They were reportedly interested in who would replace Qaboos as his heir and about Oman's relations with Iran. Kuwait mediated in the dispute.

See also
 Omanis in the United Arab Emirates
 Oman–United Arab Emirates border

References

 
United Arab Emirates
Bilateral relations of the United Arab Emirates